Muhammad Ali Bey al-Abid (1867 – 22 October 1939) or, as he spelled his own name in French, Mehmed Ali Abed, was appointed the president of the mandatory Syrian Republic (from 11 June 1932 until 21 December 1936) as a nominee of the nationalist Syrian  parliament in Damascus after the country received partial recognition of sovereignty from France. France agreed to recognize Syria as a nation under intense nationalist pressure but did not withdraw its troops completely until 1946.

Life

Background and education
Muhammad Ali al-Abid was born in Damascus, then in the Ottoman Empire. His father, Ahmad Izzat al-Abid, the son of Hawlu al-Abid, had initially been brought up in Damascus before pursuing his education in Beirut, Beirut Vilayet. Ahmad Izzat al-Abid, who was fluent in Arabic, French, and Turkish, started working in the administration of Damascus Vilayet and was authorized to found a periodical. Muhammad Ali was educated in the primary schools of Damascus then continued his education in 1885 in Beirut. In 1887, Ahmad Izzat al-Abid closed his periodical and moved to Constantinople (now Istanbul). Muhammad Ali moved with his family to Constantinople where he was sent to Galatasaray High School, a prestigious Ottoman high school. He would then study law in Paris, France, and Islamic jurisprudence, graduating in 1905. In the meantime, in 1894, his father had been introduced to Sultan ‘Abdu’l-Hamid II and would become the sultan's adviser and serve as the head of his intelligence services, and also govern over the Iraqi city of Mosul.

Diplomatic and political career
Muhammad Ali al-Abid was fluent in Arabic, French, and Turkish and fond of French literature and economics; he also had a good knowledge of English and Persian. Al-Abid started to work in the Foreign Affairs administration. In 1907, he became the Ottoman Empire's ambassador to Washington. However, he returned to the Ottoman Empire soon, after the declaration of the Ottoman Empire's constitution on 23 July 1908, when the Young Turks revolted against Abdu'l-Hamid II. His father escaped from Constantinople and went to London. Al-Abid joined his father traveling between England, Switzerland, France, and reached Egypt on the eve of World War I.

Al-Abid moved back to Damascus in the summer of 1920 when Syria came under the French Mandate. In 1922, Al-Abid was appointed Syria's Minister of Finance.

On 30 April 1932 Al-Abid was elected to the parliament in Damascus as a nominee of the National Bloc (Syria) and then elevated to the presidency on 11 June of the same year.

In 1936, after a free parliament was elected in Damascus, he resigned and went to Paris. He was replaced by Hashim al-Atasi, the nominee of the National Bloc, though Syria would remain in control militarily until full independence in 1946.

Al-Abid died on October 22, 1939 from a heart attack at a hotel in Rome. His body was transferred to Beirut, from which the funerary procession left to Damascus on November 16. Bahij al-Khatib had become president a few months before his death.

Distinctions
 Commandeur of the Légion d'honneur (1932)

See also
 Ottoman Empire-United States relations

Notes

References

External links
  Muhammad Ali al-Abid

1867 births
1939 deaths
Presidents of Syria
20th-century Syrian politicians
Arabs from the Ottoman Empire
Politicians from Damascus
Syrian ministers of finance
Galatasaray High School alumni
Ambassadors of the Ottoman Empire to the United States
20th-century people from the Ottoman Empire
20th-century diplomats
Commandeurs of the Légion d'honneur